Lo Valledor is a station on the Santiago Metro in Santiago, Chile. It is underground, between the stations Cerrillos and Presidente Pedro Aguirre Cerda on the same line. It is located on the Carlos Valdovinos Avenue, in the commune of Pedro Aguirre Cerda. It was named after the Lo Valledor Market, the biggest open market for fruits, vegetables, groceries and meat in the country, as well as a neighbourhood in the surrounded area. The station was opened on 2 November 2017 as part of the inaugural section of the line, between Cerrillos and Los Leones.

References

Santiago Metro stations
Railway stations opened in 2017
2017 establishments in Chile
Santiago Metro Line 6